This is a list of the busiest airports in the Caribbean region by passenger traffic. Statistics are available for almost all the airstrips taken into account. The present list intends to include all the international airports located in the area geographically defined as the Caribbean.
Given that each country has a different body to control these statistics, the compilation of data is difficult and not homogeneously distributed. The information presented here, represents the best available data from different Internet sources. The list contains statistics for different years, since each country authority does not have strong regulations reporting passengers traffic. The ranking is ordered according to total passenger traffic (unless the footnotes indicate the contrary). Information on aircraft movements or cargo movements is not available for all of the airports.

In graph

Ranking of airports 

Note: Although there are more than fifteen international airports in the Caribbean area, statistics were not available for each one of them. Any additional information could improve the article.

Notes

See also
 List of the busiest airports in Central America
 List of the busiest airports in Latin America
 List of the busiest airports in South America

References

Caribbean
Airports
Caribbean
 Busiest